Francis McLean may refer to:

 Francis McLean (politician) (1863–1926), Australian politician
 Francis McLean (British Army officer) (1717–1781)
 Francis McLean (engineer) (1904–1998), British engineer